Joseph-François Hertel de la Fresnière (fr, baptised 3 July 1642 - buried 22 May 1722) was a military officer of New France.  Born in Trois-Rivières when it was a small frontier town to Jacques Hertel, Lord Hertel and Marie Marguerie, he grew up with the constant threat of military action against the Iroquois.  Captured by the Iroquois in 1661, he was adopted by an old Iroquois woman, and spent as long as two years among them, learning their language and ways.  He managed to escape and make his way home, where his family had thought him dead.

He participated in numerous expeditions against the Iroquois, and assisted in the construction of Fort Frontenac.  He was briefly imprisoned by French authorities on allegations of illegal fur trade in 1678.  Upon the outbreak of King William's War in 1689, he was chosen by Governor Frontenac to lead an expedition in 1690 that successfully raided Salmon Falls on the Maine-New Hampshire border, and then contributed to the successful destruction of a settlement on Falmouth Neck (site of present-day Portland, Maine).  Upon his return to Canada, he participated in the defense of Quebec when it was attacked by New England colonists under Sir William Phips.

He married Marguerite de Thavenet on September 22, 1664, and had 15 children.  Some of his sons, most famously Jean-Baptiste Hertel de Rouville, followed him into military service, and the name Hertel became notorious in the English colonies because of their exploits.  In 1716, after many years of requests by New France's governors on his behalf, he was elevated to local nobility.

One of Hertel's sisters was Marguerite (b. August 26, 1649), who married Jean Crevier de Saint-François, in 1663.

References
 Biography at Dictionary of Canadian Biography
 The Question of Jacques Hertel, An Analysis of a Controversy Surrounding Him

1642 births
1722 deaths
French military personnel of the Nine Years' War
Military history of Acadia
Military history of Canada
Military history of New England
Military history of Nova Scotia
People of New France